David Michael Davis  (born 23 December 1948) is a British politician who served as Shadow Home Secretary from 2003 to 2008 and Secretary of State for Exiting the European Union from 2016 to 2018. A member of the Conservative Party, he has served as the Member of Parliament (MP) for Haltemprice and Howden, formerly Boothferry, since 1987. Davis was sworn of the Privy Council in the 1997 New Year Honours, having previously been Minister of State for Europe from 1994 to 1997.

He was brought up on the Aboyne Estate, a council estate in Tooting, South West London. After attending Bec Grammar School in Tooting he gained an MBA at the age of 25 and went into a career with Tate & Lyle. Having entered Parliament in 1987 at the age of 38 he was appointed Europe Minister by Prime Minister John Major in July 1994. He held that position until the 1997 general election. He was subsequently Chairman of the Conservative Party and Shadow Secretary of State for the Office of the Deputy Prime Minister under Iain Duncan Smith.

Between 2003 and 2008 he was the Shadow Home Secretary in the Shadow Cabinets of both Michael Howard and David Cameron. Davis had previously been a candidate for the leadership of the Conservative Party in 2001 and 2005, coming fourth and second respectively. On 12 June 2008 Davis unexpectedly announced his intention to resign as an MP and was immediately replaced as Shadow Home Secretary; this was in order to force a by-election in his seat, for which he intended to seek reelection by mounting a specific campaign designed to provoke wider public debate about the erosion of civil liberties in the United Kingdom. Following his formal resignation as an MP he became the Conservative candidate in the resulting by-election, which he won a month later.

In July 2016, following a referendum in which a majority of over 1 million of those voting, supported leaving the European Union, Davis was appointed by the new Prime Minister, Theresa May, to the new Department for Exiting the European Union (DExEU) as Secretary of State, with responsibility for negotiating the UK's prospective exit from the EU. He was sidelined mid-way through the talks, with the Prime Minister's Europe Adviser Olly Robbins taking charge of negotiations. Davis resigned from his government position on 8 July 2018 over May's Brexit strategy and the Chequers plan. Following his resignation, the DExEU junior minister Steve Baker and the Foreign Secretary Boris Johnson also resigned.

Early life 
Born to a single mother, Betty Brown, in York on 23 December 1948, Davis was initially raised by his grandparents there. His maternal grandfather, Walter Harrison, was the son of a wealthy trawlerman but was disinherited after joining the Communist Party; he led a 'hunger march' to London shortly after the more famous Jarrow March, which did not allow Communists to participate. His father, whom he met once after his mother's death, is Welsh. After his mother married Ronald Davis the family moved to London, where they lived initially in a flat in Wandsworth, which Davis has described as "a terrible little slum". Later, after his half-sister was born, the family moved to a council estate in Tooting, his stepfather being a shop steward at Battersea Power Station.

When he left Bec Grammar School in Tooting, his A Level results were not good enough to secure a university place so Davis worked as an insurance clerk and became a soldier in the Territorial Army's 21 SAS (Artists) Regiment to earn the money to retake his examinations. After doing so he won a place at the University of Warwick (BSc Joint Hons Molecular Science/Computer Science 1968–1971). While at Warwick he was one of the founding members of the student radio station, University Radio Warwick. He went straight from there to London Business School, where he earned a master's degree in business (1971–1973), and later attended Harvard Business School's Advanced Management Program (1984–85).

Davis worked for Tate & Lyle for 17 years, rising to become a senior executive, including restructuring its troubled Canadian subsidiary, Redpath Sugar. He wrote about his business experiences in the 1988 book How to Turn Round a Company.

Political career 
While a student Davis was active in the Federation of Conservative Students, becoming national chairman in 1973.

Davis was first elected to Parliament in the 1987 general election as the MP for Boothferry, which in 1997 became the constituency of Haltemprice and Howden. He was a government whip when parliament voted on the Maastricht Treaty in 1992, angering many of the Maastricht Rebels on his own right wing of the party. Davis's progression through the Conservative ranks eventually led to his becoming a Minister of State at the Foreign and Commonwealth Office (1994–1997).

He rejected a shadow ministerial position under William Hague, opting instead to chair the Public Accounts Committee. 

In 1999, Davis presented the Parliamentary Control of the Executive Bill to the House of Commons, in which he proposed to transfer ministerial exercise of the Royal Prerogative to the Commons in the following areas: the signing of treaties; the diplomatic recognition of foreign governments; European Union legislation; the appointment of ministers, peers and ambassadors; the establishment of Royal Commissions; the proclamation of Orders in Council unless subject to resolutions of the Commons; the exercise of the powers of the executive not made by statute; the declarations of states of emergency; the dissolution of Parliament.

Davis used his first interview as Shadow Home Secretary in November 2003 to state his personal support for a reintroduction of the death penalty for people convicted of multiple murder "where there is clear evidence and no doubt" surrounding the offender's guilt, citing the Yorkshire Ripper Peter Sutcliffe and Moors Murderer Ian Brady as examples of offenders who would fall into that category. This interview came almost 40 years after the abolition of the death penalty for murder. 

As Shadow Home Secretary, Davis turned the Conservatives away from the Labour Party's plan to reintroduce identity cards, citing spiralling costs and libertarian issues. 

He turned initial Conservative support into one of concern and abstention, making the final change to one of opposition much easier. Davis believed that once the true cost and unreliability of the ID card scheme was explained to the general public they would turn against it. He was also credited by some commentators with "claiming the scalps" of two Labour ministers, David Blunkett and Beverley Hughes, after both were forced to resign.

2005 leadership contest 
At the time of the 2005 Conservative leadership contest, David Davis was Shadow Secretary of State for the Home Department. His campaign manager in the contest was Conservative MP and Davis' deputy as Shadow Home Secretary, Andrew Mitchell (who in 2010 became Secretary of State for International Development in Prime Minister David Cameron's cabinet).

Davis was initially the front runner in the contest, but after a poorly received speech at that year's Conservative Party Conference his campaign was seen to lose momentum. 

However, referring to a Conference speech by the party's former leader, campaign manager Andrew Mitchell said: "William Hague made a great speech which many people will judge to be better than all the other leadership candidates put together. What that tells you is that being absolutely brilliant at being able to make a speech at conference is not the be-all-and-end-all of leadership. There are other things as well." He was photographed at the conference alongside two women wearing T-shirts emblazoned with "It's DD for me" which was viewed by some women as being patronising to them.

In the first ballot of Conservative MPs on 18 October 2005, Davis came top with 62 votes. As this was less than the number of his declared supporters, it became clear that the Davis bid was losing momentum. The elimination of former Chancellor Kenneth Clarke left the bookmakers' favourite, David Cameron, without a rival in the centre of the party. In the second ballot, held two days later on 20 October 2005, Cameron polled 90 votes, Davis 57 votes and Liam Fox was eliminated with 51 votes, so Davis went through to the next stage with David Cameron.

Despite a strong performance in a BBC Question Time head-to-head debate in the final stage of the leadership contest, Davis could not match his rival's general popularity. Conservative Party members voted to elect Cameron the new Conservative leader, Davis losing with 64,398 votes against Cameron's 134,446 votes. Cameron chose to re-appoint his rival as Shadow Home Secretary following his victory.

Alleged role in leaking of government documents

Davis is alleged to have played a role in the leaking of sensitive government documents when he was Shadow Home Secretary in 2007. According to a police statement, under interview after arrest, civil servant Chris Galley said Davis was his first contact and that he (Davis) introduced him to Damien Green, the Shadow Immigration spokesman.  Chris Galley initially approached Davis stating he had access to government immigration details which he was willing to leak to help the Conservative Party. Under questioning by police Galley said that Green told him "do not mention Davis". In April 2009, following a disciplinary hearing, Galley was dismissed from his job as a junior Home Office official for leaking information to Green.

Civil liberties 

On 12 June 2008, Davis resigned from the Shadow Cabinet and announced his resignation as an MP, in order to force a by-election, and cause a wider debate on the single issue of what he believed to be the erosion of civil liberties. On 18 June 2008, he resigned from the House of Commons. He stood as the Conservative Party candidate for his current seat in the subsequent by-election. The announcement came a day after the narrow passing of a parliamentary vote on the Counter-Terrorism Bill, which would extend the limit on the period of detention of terror suspects without charge in England and Wales, from 28 to 42 days.

He won re-election with 72% of the vote, breaking several voting records in the UK, but neither the Labour Party nor the Liberal Democrats put up a candidate. As is common at by-elections, voter turnout declined significantly from the previous general election to 34%.

At the time of Davis's resignation, the Labour MP Andy Burnham made a speech which was widely interpreted as falsely implying an inappropriate relationship between Davis and the then Director of Liberty, Shami Chakrabarti. Burnham was forced to issue a public apology under threat of legal action.

As a backbench MP, Davis continued campaigning for civil liberties. He participated in the Convention on Modern Liberty, where he gave the keynote speech on the convention's final day. He also spoke at the 2009 Guardian Hay Festival, where he criticised Labour's "illusory pursuit of an unobtainable security", and was well received by an overwhelmingly non-Conservative audience. On 15 June 2009, Davis gave the 2009 Magna Carta Lecture at Royal Holloway, University of London, in association with the Magna Carta Trust.

Davis has also supported civil liberties campaign group Big Brother Watch and in January 2010 he spoke with Tony Benn at the official launch. In 2012 he helped lead the opposition to Coalition plans to allow police and security services to extend their monitoring of the public's email and social media communications. He expressed concern with the findings of a VICE News investigation into the deployment of IMSI-catchers in London.

In 2014, along with Labour MP Tom Watson he challenged the government's introduction of the Data Retention and Investigatory Powers Act 2014 in the courts. Although Davis is a staunch Eurosceptic and has criticised the record of the European Court of Human Rights, he has also argued against withdrawal from the court's jurisdiction, on the basis it might encourage countries with far worse civil liberties to do likewise.

Davis has taken more conservative stances on some other civil liberties issues, having repeatedly voted to restrict abortion, fertility treatment and embryo research. He also repeatedly voted against the furthering of LGBT rights, including supporting the controversial Section 28, which banned teachers from "promoting homosexuality" or "teaching ... the acceptability of homosexuality as a pretended family relationship", and opposing the legalisation of same-sex marriage saying it was "not an issue of rights but a clash of beliefs".

Allegations of torture
During a House of Commons debate on 7 July 2009, Davis accused the UK government of outsourcing torture, by allowing Rangzieb Ahmed to leave the country (even though the government had evidence against Ahmed, upon which Ahmed was later convicted for terrorism) to Pakistan, where it is said the Inter-Services Intelligence was given the go-ahead by the British intelligence agencies to torture Ahmed. Davis further accused the government of trying to gag Ahmed, stopping him coming forward with his accusations after he had been imprisoned back in the UK.

He said, there was "an alleged request to drop his allegations of torture: if he did that, they could get his sentence cut and possibly give him some money. If this request to drop the torture case is true, it is frankly monstrous. It would at the very least be a criminal misuse of the powers and funds under the Government's Contest strategy, and at worst a conspiracy to pervert the course of justice."

Davis was amongst the signatories of a letter in 2012 to The Guardian condemning the Coalition's efforts to hide the UK's involvement in rendition and torture behind secret trials.

Coalition government (2010–2015) 
In May 2010, after the 2010 general election which resulted in a hung parliament, it was reported that David Cameron wanted to invite Davis and other right-wingers such as Michael Howard and Iain Duncan Smith into his Conservative–Liberal Democrat coalition cabinet. However, Davis declined and remained a critic of the government on its stance on tuition fees. In January 2011, along with Jack Straw, he secured a vote in the Commons to challenge a ruling by the European Court of Human Rights that prisoners should be allowed to vote and MPs subsequently chose to ignore the ruling. He offered critical commentary on the coalition in a BBC interview in March 2012.

In 2012, together with Liam Fox, Davis founded Conservative pressure group Conservative Voice to amplify the voice of grassroots members, which Davis thought was getting lost in the party.

In a November 2012 speech, he urged David Cameron to hold a referendum on the UK's membership of the EU by 2014. He suggested to hold two votes, the first where voters would be asked whether they wanted to renegotiate current EU arrangements, and a second where they would be asked to either accept a renegotiated deal or leave the EU altogether.

In 2015, he was one of seven Conservative MPs to defy the whip and vote against bombing Syria.

Secretary of State for Exiting the European Union (2016–2018) 
Following Theresa May's appointment as Prime Minister, Davis was appointed Secretary of State for Exiting the European Union (Brexit Secretary) on 13 July 2016. He published in ConservativeHome his initial thoughts on the way Brexit might proceed. In his role as Brexit Secretary, Davis announced that Parliament will take action on translating EU laws into British laws as part of the process of Withdrawal from the European Union. Davis stated that the Brexit timetable discussion would be the "row of the summer" during a TV interview with Robert Peston on Peston on Sunday. The timetable was set on the first day of negotiations and it was dictated by the EU.

On 7 September 2017, the European commission published the minutes of a meeting in July at which Michel Barnier, the EU's chief Brexit negotiator, briefed the commission on the outcome of his first round of talks with Davis. Barnier expressed concern about Davis's commitment to the talks (he had been going to Brussels for the start and end of each round of talks, but had not been staying there for the duration).

In November 2017, Davis acknowledged that the negotiations with the EU were difficult, but appealed to European countries not to "put politics above prosperity", implying that by doing so, countries like Germany would harm their own economies. He blamed Germany and France for blocking trade negotiations. Davis also argued that the UK and the EU should agree a free trade deal more comprehensive in scope than "any the EU has agreed before".

Some politicians were angry because reports about the potential effect of Brexit on 58 economic sectors were severely edited before Davis gave them to the Exiting the European Union Select Committee. They maintained Davis – and by implication Theresa May's government – chose to disregard a binding and unanimous vote from MPs requiring the information to be provided in full. Davis later appeared to contradict his earlier assurances that impact analyses had been carried out when he said the government had not produced any economic forecasts of what would happen after the UK leaves the EU.

David was sidelined in December 2017, mid-way through the negotiations, with the Prime Minister's Europe Adviser Olly Robbins taking charge of negotiations.

In January 2018, former Irish Prime Minister Bertie Ahern said Davis did not understand the implications of Brexit for Ireland's border with Northern Ireland.

On 8 July 2018, Davis resigned as Brexit Secretary as he did not "believe" in the Prime Minister's Chequers plan for Brexit. Following Davis' resignation, Steve Baker and Boris Johnson also resigned.

Since 2018 
On 20 November 2018, Davis was criticised by the Liberal Democrat MP Layla Moran, of the pro-EU group Best for Britain, for suggesting that the UK could negotiate a free trade agreement during a post-Brexit "transition period" without first having successfully negotiated a withdrawal agreement with the European Union.

Following Theresa May's resignation in May 2019, Davis supported Dominic Raab as the next leader of the Conservative Party.

Davis was re-elected in Haltemprice and Howden at the 2019 general election, increasing his majority by 5,000 votes. He has opposed the proposed extradition of Julian Assange to the United States.

Davis has also been prominent in opposing the plans of the Johnson administration to privatise NHS data, advocating more transparency in the management of patient data.

During Prime Minister's Questions on 19 January 2022, Davis asked Prime Minister Boris Johnson to resign, after expressing dissatisfaction with his response to Partygate. He quoted what Leo Amery (alluding to Oliver Cromwell) had said to Prime Minister Neville Chamberlain in 1940: "You have sat there too long for all the good you have done. In the name of God, go."

On 2 October 2022, Davis wrote an article in The Daily Telegraph which advocated for reform of the National Health Service and the adoption of a social insurance-based system. He wrote that the NHS was "plagued by ineffective bureaucracy" and that structural reform did not mean that the principles of the NHS being universal and free at the point of delivery needed to be abandoned.

Personal life 
Davis met his wife, Doreen Cook, at Warwick. They married on 28 July 1973 and have three children.

References

External links 

 
 David Davis MP  official Conservative Party profile
 
 Open Rights Group – David Davis MP
 BBC News – Profile: David Davis 17 October 2002
 BBC News – Profile: David Davis 23 July 2002
 Full text of 2005 conference speech
 David Davis | Politics | The Guardian
 

|-

|-

|-

|-

|-

|-

|-

|-

1948 births
Alumni of London Business School
Alumni of the University of Warwick
Artists' Rifles soldiers
Brexit
Chairmen of the Conservative Party (UK)
Conservative Party (UK) MPs for English constituencies
English people of Welsh descent
Living people
Members of the Privy Council of the United Kingdom
People from Tooting
People from Wandsworth
Politicians from York
Secretaries of State for Exiting the European Union
Special Air Service soldiers
UK MPs 1987–1992
UK MPs 1992–1997
UK MPs 1997–2001
UK MPs 2001–2005
UK MPs 2005–2010
UK MPs 2010–2015
UK MPs 2015–2017
UK MPs 2017–2019
UK MPs 2019–present
British libertarians
British Eurosceptics